Daniela Duque Estrada Polzin (born March 4, 1979 in Rio de Janeiro) is a Brazilian judoka who competed in the women's extra-lightweight category. She held a 2008 Brazilian senior title for her own division, picked up a total of seventeen medals in her career, including a silver from the 2007 Pan American Games in Rio de Janeiro, and also represented Brazil in the 57-kg class at the 2004 Summer Olympics. Throughout most of her sporting career, Polzin also trained as a full-fledged member of Universidade Gama Filho's judo squad.

Polzin qualified for the Brazilian squad in the women's extra-lightweight class (48 kg) at the 2004 Summer Olympics in Athens, by placing second from the Pan American Judo Championships in Margarita Island, Venezuela. She lost her opening match to Chinese judoka and eventual bronze medalist Gao Feng, who successfully scored an ippon, and gripped her in the tatami with a kata guruma (shoulder wheel) assault at one minute and twenty-seven seconds.

When her country Brazil hosted the 2007 Pan American Games in Rio de Janeiro, Polzin had to satisfy with a silver medal during her final match against Cuba's Yanet Bermoy in the 48-kg division.

References

External links

UOL Esporte Bio 

1979 births
Living people
Olympic judoka of Brazil
Judoka at the 2004 Summer Olympics
Judoka at the 2007 Pan American Games
Pan American Games silver medalists for Brazil
Sportspeople from Rio de Janeiro (city)
Brazilian female judoka
Pan American Games medalists in judo
South American Games silver medalists for Brazil
South American Games medalists in judo
Competitors at the 2002 South American Games
Medalists at the 2007 Pan American Games
20th-century Brazilian women
21st-century Brazilian women